The Yarra Yarra Rowing Club is a rowing club on the Yarra River in Melbourne.  It was founded in the 1870s by members of the Early Closing Association when several drapers in Bourke Street agreed to close on Saturday afternoons.

References

External links 
 Club web site

1871 establishments in Australia
Rowing clubs in Australia
Sports clubs established in 1871
Sporting clubs in Melbourne
Sport in the City of Melbourne (LGA)